Melissa Ann Geha (born April 29, 1987) is an American former soccer player who played as a midfielder.

References

1987 births
Living people
Sportspeople from Overland Park, Kansas
Soccer players from Kansas
American women's soccer players
Women's association football midfielders
Kansas Jayhawks women's soccer players
FC Kansas City players
National Women's Soccer League players